Seemabia Tahir is a Pakistani politician who had been a member of the Provincial Assembly of the Punjab from August 2018 till January 2023.

She has performed her duties as the Spokesperson for Punjab Gov from 2018 till aug 2021.
Syndicate Member for the UET & RWP Women Uni.
Board member for UET Taxila.
Member for Steering Committees
Women development &   Empowerment.
Social welfare.
Member for provincial Drug Monitoring Committee.
Member for SDG'S Punjab
Member for Health board punjab (importance of breast feeding)
Member of Media Strategic Committee.

Political career

She was selected to the Provincial Assembly of the Punjab as a candidate of Pakistan Tehreek-e-Insaf (PTI) on a reserved seat for women in 2018 Pakistani general election.

References

Living people
Punjabi people
Punjab MPAs 2018–2023
Pakistan Tehreek-e-Insaf MPAs (Punjab)
Year of birth missing (living people)
Women members of the Provincial Assembly of the Punjab
21st-century Pakistani women politicians